Ethyl levulinate is an organic compound with the formula CH3C(O)CH2CH2C(O)OC2H5. It is an ester derived from the keto acid levulinic acid. Ethyl levulinate can also be obtained by reaction between ethanol and furfuryl alcohol. These two synthesis options make ethyl levulinate a viable biofuel option, since both precursors can be obtained from biomass: levulinic acid from 6-carbon polymerized sugars such as cellulose, and furfural from 5-carbon polymerized sugars such as xylan and arabinan.

References 

Carboxylate esters
Ethyl esters